Lieutenant General Om Prakash, PVSM, UYSM, AVSM, SM is a retired General of the Indian Army. He was the commander of the XV Corps in 2012.

Early life and education
He was born on 10 April 1955 to Kasturi Devi and C H Roopchand in Bahrai village of Jhajjar district, Haryana.[3][5][6][7]  He completed his primary education in his native village and then moved to Sainik School, Bijapur, Karnataka for his secondary education in 1967 before joining the National Defence Academy in 1972. He holds Master of Science Degree in Defence Studies and Master of Philosophy Degree in Defence Studies and Strategic Studies. He has also attended United Nations Peace Support Mission Planning Course, at Nairobi, Kenya, International Humanitarian Law Course at International Institute of Humanitarian Law San Remo, Italy, Defence Services Staff College, Wellington and National Defence College, New Delhi.

Military career
He has served extensively in Counter Terrorist & Counter Insurgency Operational areas in Jammu & Kashmir and North East India. He has even served with Indian Peace Keeping Force (IPKF) in Sri Lanka and headed a United Nations Special Force in Iraq. He commanded the Chinar Corps and was awarded the Uttam Yudh Sewa Medal. He also commanded an Infantry Division (Ace of Spades Division) in Jammu and Kashmir and was awarded the Ati Vishisht Sewa Medal. He commanded Siachen Brigade, and was bestowed with the gallantry award of Sena Medal  and commanded a Battalion along Indo-Tibet border in Arunachal Pradesh.

Awards and decorations

The General has received the following medals and decorations throughout his military career:
 Param Vishisht Seva Medal 
 Uttam Yudh Seva Medal
 Ati Vishisht Seva Medal
 Sena Medal

References
 

Indian generals
Living people
Recipients of the Param Vishisht Seva Medal
1955 births
Indian Army personnel
People from Jhajjar district
Recipients of the Uttam Yudh Seva Medal
Recipients of the Ati Vishisht Seva Medal
Sainik School alumni
National Defence Academy (India) alumni
Indian Military Academy alumni
National Defence College, India alumni
Defence Services Staff College alumni